Highway 954 is a provincial highway in the Canadian province of Saskatchewan. It runs from Highway 26 on the north side of Goodsoil to a dead end at Northern Cross Resort on Lac des Îles within the Meadow Lake Provincial Park. At the eastern end of the highway is the Goodsoil Airport.

Major intersections

See also 
Roads in Saskatchewan
Transportation in Saskatchewan

References 

954